The Ceará gubernatorial election will be held on 5 October 2014 to elect the next governor of the state of Ceará. If no candidate receives more than 50% of the vote, a second-round runoff election will be held on the 26th of October.  Governor Cid Gomes is ineligible to run due to term limits.

Candidates

Opinion Polling

References

2014
2014 Brazilian gubernatorial elections
October 2014 events in South America